Ángel Rodrigo Cardozo Lucena (born 19 October 1994) is a Paraguayan international footballer who plays for Cerro Porteño, as a central midfielder.

Career
Cardozo Lucena has played for football club Rubio Ñu.

References

External links
 

1994 births
Living people
Sportspeople from Asunción
Paraguayan footballers
Paraguay under-20 international footballers
Paraguay international footballers
Club Rubio Ñu footballers
Club Libertad footballers
Cerro Porteño players
Association football midfielders
Footballers at the 2015 Pan American Games
Pan American Games competitors for Paraguay